Admiral Sir William Richard Scott Thomas  (22 March 1932 – 13 December 1998) was the Gentleman Usher of the Black Rod (or simply Black Rod) in the British Parliament's House of Lords from January 1992 to 8 May 1995.

Naval career
Educated at Downside School, Thomas joined the Navy in 1951. He was given command of the destroyer HMS Troubridge in 1966. He went on to be Staff Officer Operations to the Flag Officer, Scotland and Northern Ireland and saw action in the Second Cod War in 1972. Promoted to Captain, he took part in Polaris development at the Ministry of Defence before being given command of the assault ship HMS Fearless. He went on to be Director of Seaman Officers' Appointments in 1982, Naval Secretary in 1983 and Flag Officer, Second Flotilla in 1985. Promoted to vice admiral, he became Deputy Supreme Allied Commander Atlantic at Norfolk, Virginia in 1987 and the UK Military Representative to NATO from 1989 to 1992, when he retired from the Royal Navy.

In retirement he became Gentleman Usher of the Black Rod. Amongst other honours, he was awarded a papal knighthood in the Order of Pope Pius IX.

Family
Thomas was born 22 Mar 1932 in Rhyl, Wales, the son of Mary Hilda Bertha "Maimie" (née Hemelryk) and Welsh-born Commander William Scott Thomas DSC RN (who commanded the HMS Impulsive during World War II) and brother of Lieutenant Commander Simon Scott Thomas, RN. In 1959, he married Paddy Cullinan; they had 8 children. He was the uncle of actresses Kristin Scott Thomas and Serena Scott Thomas (the "Scott" portion of their last names coming from another British naval officer, Capt. Robert F. Scott, the ill-fated explorer of the South Pole).

References

|-

|-

|-

1932 births
1998 deaths
Royal Navy admirals
Knights Commander of the Order of the Bath
Knights Commander of the Royal Victorian Order
Officers of the Order of the British Empire
People educated at Downside School
Ushers of the Black Rod
Welsh military personnel
People from Rhyl